Ulrik Munther is the self-titled debut studio album by Swedish singer-songwriter Ulrik Munther. It was released on 24 August 2011 in Sweden under the Universal Music record label and hit number one on the Swedish Albums Chart in its first week of release, staying at that position for one week. All of the songs were composed by Munther himself.

Munther re-released the album on 29 February 2012 after his participation in the Melodifestivalen 2012. It contains two more tracks; "Soldiers", which was performed at Melodifestivalen 2012 and the track "Fool".

Singles
 Munther's debut single was "Boys Don't Cry", and was released on 29 December 2010. It first charted in the Swedish Singles Chart on July 14, 2011, entering at #42 before dropping out. It then re-entered on August 11 at its peak position of #31. The single release on iTunes contained the demo version of eventual album track "Life".
 "Born This Way" received a single release on iTunes on 2 March 2011, making it the second single from the album.
 "Moments Ago" was the third single from the album, released on 17 June 2011.
 The final single from Ulrik Munther was from the 2012 re-issue. "Soldiers" was the song Munther performed at Melodifestivalen 2012 and finished in third place with. It was released on 25 February 2012 and peaked at #6 in Sweden on its third week after entering at #53.

Track listing
Credits adapted from the liner notes of Ulrik Munther.

Charts

Weekly charts

Year-end charts

Certifications

References

2011 debut albums
Ulrik Munther albums